The 2009 Slovak Super Cup was a football match played on July 5, 2009, in Dolný Kubín, Slovakia.

The match was played between Corgoň Liga 2008–09 champions ŠK Slovan Bratislava and the Slovak Cup 2008–09 winners MFK Košice, and was won by Slovan Bratislava 2–0 to earn their third Super Cup.

The match was attended by 1,400 viewers. Referee was Ján Valášek, who was assisted by Kubačka and Chládek.

Match details

References

Slovak Super Cup
Super Cup
Slovak Super Cup
FC VSS Košice matches

pl:Superpuchar Słowacji w piłce nożnej#2009